Mount Murray is a  heritage-listed former railway station in Mount Murray on the Unanderra to Moss Vale railway line in New South Wales, Australia. The station is listed on local and NSW State Heritage Registers as a rare surviving example of small station infrastructure. The platform is located on a passing loop, which is still in use today.

History 
The platform was constructed from pre-cast concrete and the single small station building was of timber. The crossing loop was reopened and extended to  following the installation of CTC in the 1980s. Since September 2008, signalling functions for the crossing loop through the station and the adjoining main line have been managed by ARTC's network control centre in Junee.

Description 

The station precinct consists of a timber wayside station building of a type 13 design with a platform faced in pre-cast concrete, dating from 1932. A toilet block also forms part of the complex.

Heritage status
The station buildings were listed as heritage items by Wingecarribee Shire Council in 1989. In 1999 the station and an area of tracks  either side of it were also listed on the NSW State Heritage Register. The station was described as architecturally, historically and socially rare, and "representative of many small structures that have been removed from the rail system as branch lines and small locations have become redundant."

The line alongside the platform also forms part of the Sydney to Moss Vale heritage run operated by 3801 steam locomotives.

References

External links 
 Photo of station
 Mount Murray railway station

Railway stations in Australia opened in 1932
Disused regional railway stations in New South Wales
New South Wales State Heritage Register